Healthcare in Malaysia is mainly under the Ministry of Health. Malaysia generally has an efficient and widespread system of health care, operating a two-tier health care system consisting of both a government base universal healthcare system and a co-existing private healthcare system. While there is a universal healthcare system, specialist services require queuing despite being free. Hence the private health care plays a major role in providing specialist services which complements the universal health care. 

Most insurance covers medical fees in Malaysia.

History
Healthcare in Malaysia has undergone radical transformations. Earliest pre-colonial medical care was confined to traditional remedies current among local people. The advent of colonialism brought western medical practice into the country. Since the country's independence in August 1957, the system of medical care transferred from the British colonial rule has been transformed to meet the needs of emerging diseases, as well as national political requirements.

Healthcare today in Malaysia

Malaysia has a widespread system of health care. It implements a universal healthcare system, which exists alongside the private healthcare system. Infant mortality rate – a standard in determining the overall efficiency of healthcare – in 2005 was 10, comparing favourably with the United States and western Europe. Life expectancy at birth in 2005 was 74 years. Infant mortality fell from 75 per 1000 live births in 1957 to 7 in 2013.

Healthcare in Malaysia is divided into private and public sectors. Public provision is rather basic, especially in rural areas. The government produced a plan, 1Care for 1Malaysia, in 2009, with the intention of reform based on the principle ‘use according to need, pay according to ability’, but little progress towards its implementation has been made.  Malaysian society places importance on the expansion and development of healthcare, putting 5% of the government social sector development budget into public healthcare, an increase of more than 47% over the previous figure. This has meant an overall increase of more than RM 2 billion. With a rising and ageing population, the Government wishes to improve in many areas including the refurbishment of existing hospitals, building and equipping new hospitals, expansion of the number of polyclinics, and improvements in training and expansion of telehealth. Over the last couple of years, they have increased their efforts to overhaul the systems and attract more foreign investment.

Hospitals

The government hospitals have the country's best healthcare equipment and facilities apart from having specialists in the field. However, the main drawback is the shortage of staff in public hospitals compare to number of patients seeking treatment has led to long queues. Private hospitals are mostly located at urban areas and are equipped with the latest diagnostic and imaging facilities. Private hospitals were not seen as an ideal investment: it has often taken up to ten years before companies have seen any profits. However, the situation has now changed and companies are now exploring this area again, corresponding with the increased number of foreigners entering Malaysia for medical care and the recent government focus on developing the health tourism industry. The Government has also been trying to promote Malaysia as a health care destination, regionally and internationally.

Foreign doctors are encouraged to apply for employment in Malaysia, especially if they are qualified to a higher level. There is still, however, a significant shortage in the medical workforce, especially of highly trained specialists; thus, certain medical care and treatment are available only in large cities. Recent efforts to bring many facilities to other towns have been hampered by lack of expertise to run the available equipment. As a result, certain medical care and treatment is available only in large cities.

Government agencies have invested heavily in healthcare companies. About a third of private hospital beds are in concerns with government investment.

Government policy and action
The Malaysian government places importance on the expansion and development of health care, putting 5% of the government social sector development budget into public health care—an increase of more than 47% over the previous figure. This has meant an overall increase of more than RM 2 billion. With a rising and ageing population, the Government wishes to improve in many areas including the refurbishment of existing hospitals, building and equipping new hospitals, expansion of the number of polyclinics, and improvements in training and expansion of telehealth. A major problem with the health care sector is the lack of medical centres for rural areas, which the government is trying to counter through the development of and expansion of a system called "tele-primary care". Another issue is the overprescription of drugs, though this has decreased in recent years. Over the last couple of years, the Malaysian Health Ministry has increased its efforts to overhaul the system and attract more foreign investment. 

There is also an initiative by the Malaysian government to provide 1 Malaysia Clinic, a government based clinic that is free for all citizens. The medicine are usually cheap while consultations are free.

Influenza
The Malaysian government has developed a National Influenza Pandemic Preparedness Plan (NIPPP) which serves as a time bound guide for preparedness and response plan for influenza pandemic. It provides a policy and strategic framework for a multisectoral response and contains specific advice and actions to be undertaken by the Ministry of Health at the different levels, other governmental departments and agencies and non-governmental organisations to ensure that resources are mobilised and used most efficiently before, during and after a pandemic episode. Since the Nipah virus outbreak in 1999, the Malaysian Health Ministry have put in place processes to be better prepared to protect the Malaysian population from the threat of infectious diseases. Malaysia was fully prepared during the Severe Acute Respiratory Syndrome (SARS) situation (Malaysia was not a SARS affected country) and the episode of the H5N1 (bird flu) outbreak in 2004.

Medicine via Post
In January 2011 the Malaysia government launched a program to renew prescriptions via mail. Medicine via Post targets patients with chronic diseases. To be eligible to participate patients have to receive a certification from a pharmacist that their condition is stable and that they understand how to properly use their medication. Patients pay delivery costs which are RM3.5 in Putrajaya, RM5.0 for other locations in Peninsular Malaysia, and RM8.0 for Sabah and Sarawak. The program is based on a pilot-project conducted at Putrajaya Hospital started in October 2009.

Medical education

The Malaysian Medical Council currently oversees the medical profession in Malaysia. There are both public and private medical schools in Malaysia. Medical training takes usually 5 years. Newly graduated doctors are required to perform at least 4 years, including 2 years of housemanship (internship before becoming a fully qualified general practitioner) and 2 years compulsory government service, in public hospitals throughout the nation, thus ensuring adequate coverage of medical needs for the general population.

See also
 Health in Malaysia
 Medical tourism in Malaysia

References

 'Malaysian Medical Council – Second Schedule of Approved Medical Schools'
 Olympia College Petaling Jaya Campus MBA-Healthcare Management
 Dr Mubbashir Iftikhar, CIO, KPJ Healthcare Bhd, updates on local healthcare IT
 Tour De Health, Medical Hospital Review Site, List Of Medical Tourism In Malaysia

Further reading

External links
 Malaysia Hospital and Healthcare consultation, Non Profit Organization Site
 Commercial links for medical tourism in Malaysia
 Malaysian Medical Association
 Ministry of Health Malaysia
 MYDOC.asia: Medical Tourism Malaysia